The 2014 Nürnberger Gastein Ladies was the 2014 edition of the Gastein Ladies clay court tennis tournament. It was the eighth edition of the tournament, which was part of the 2014 WTA Tour. It took place in Bad Gastein, Austria between 7 and 13 July 2014.

Points and prize money

Point distribution

Prize money

Singles main-draw entrants

Seeds 

 1 Rankings are as of June 23, 2014

Other entrants 
The following players received wildcards into the singles main draw:
  Lisa-Maria Moser
  Yvonne Neuwirth
  Flavia Pennetta

The following players received entry from the qualifying draw:
  Ana Bogdan
  Irina Falconi
  Shelby Rogers
  Laura Siegemund
  Kateřina Siniaková
  Tereza Smitková

The following player received entry as a lucky loser:
  Beatriz García Vidagany

Withdrawals 
Before the tournament
  Mirjana Lučić-Baroni
  Flavia Pennetta
  Lucie Šafářová

Doubles main-draw entrants

Seeds 

 1 Rankings as of June 23, 2014.

Other entrants 
The following pairs received wildcards into the main draw:
  Lisa-Maria Moser /  Laura Siegemund
  Yvonne Neuwirth /  Janina Toljan

The following pair received entry as alternates:
  Paula Ormaechea /  Dinah Pfizenmaier

Withdrawals 
Before the tournament
  Flavia Pennetta

Finals

Singles 

  Andrea Petkovic defeated  Shelby Rogers, 6–3, 6–3

Doubles 

  Karolína Plíšková /  Kristýna Plíšková defeated  Andreja Klepač /  María Teresa Torró Flor, 4–6, 6–3, [10–6]

References

External links 
 Official website

Gastein Ladies
Gastein Ladies
2014 in Austrian women's sport
July 2014 sports events in Europe
2014 in Austrian tennis,